Plettenberg is a mountain of Baden-Württemberg, Germany. It is located in Zollernalbkreis.

Vegetation
The Plettenberg is not wooded. However, the sharp transition to forest illustrates it is no natural border. Even the top of the mountain does not reach the tree line which, in this region, would lie at around 1,650–1,700 metres.

Many of the open areas are habitats for specialised species of flora; these include bogs, rock faces and snow fields. Below the summit the mountain is covered by mixed forest consisting of beech, rowan, spruce and silver fir.

That is attributable to the intensive sheep farming in this region, which limits forest growth. In 2017 milling machines was used in the sensitive area.

Butterflies and moths
Speyeria aglaja
Callophrys rubi
Erebia medusa
Zygaena viciae
Fabriciana adippe 
Boloria dia
Boloria euphrosyne
Coenonympha arcania
Colias alfacariensis
Cupido minimus
Erebia aethiops
Erebia ligea
Erynnis tages
Hamearis lucina
Lasiommata maera
Lasiommata megera
Limenitis camilla
Nymphalis antiopa
Lysandra bellargus
Lysandra coridon
Cyaniris semiargus
Satyrium w-album
Zygaena fausta
Zygaena transalpina

Public viewing
On 23 June 2017 there was special permission by the Regierungspräsidium Karlsruhe for everybody to catch butterflies.
 
Herbert Fuchs (Naturschutzbüro Zollernalb) was the leader of the training course.

References

Mountains and hills of the Swabian Jura
Zollernalbkreis
One-thousanders of Germany